The gray-bellied pencil-tailed tree mouse (Chiropodomys muroides) is a species of arboreal rodent in the family Muridae. It is endemic to Borneo where it is known from Gunung Kinabalu (Sabah, Malaysia) and from Long Petak in northern Kalimantan (Indonesia). It probably has wider distribution than currently documented. Its natural habitat is montane tropical forest. It is threatened by habitat loss.

References

Chiropodomys
Endemic fauna of Borneo
Mammals of Borneo
Rodents of Indonesia
Rodents of Malaysia
Mammals described in 1965
Taxonomy articles created by Polbot